Struggle Love is the seventh studio album by American recording artist Jaheim. It was released by Julie's Dream and BMG Records on March 18, 2016.

Critical reception

Andy Kellman of AllMusic gave the album four stars out of five, saying "The album also continues Jaheim's tradition of referencing classic R&B ballads. This time, it's the Deele's "Two Occasions," embellished with a generous rhythmic bump to complement a yearning (well, thirsting) vocal. As much as the pure sound of his voice remains roughly 65-percent Vandross, 35-percent Pendergrass, the singer's flow is still his own, as his ability to deliver an explicit line without the slightest smirk."

Commercial performance
The album debuted at number 24 on the US Billboard 200 chart.

Track listing

Charts

Weekly charts

Year-end charts

References

Jaheim albums
2016 albums